Appany (Appaanı) is a rural locality (a selo) and the administrative center of Khatyn-Arinsky Rural Okrug of Namsky District in the Sakha Republic, Russia. Its population as of the 2002 Census was 1,271.

References

Notes

Sources
Official website of the Sakha Republic. Registry of the Administrative-Territorial Divisions of the Sakha Republic. Namsky District. 

OKTMO. Vol. 8. Code 98 635 455. January 1, 2014.

Rural localities in Namsky District
Populated places on the Lena River